Rzeszów–Jasionka Airport  is an international airport located in southeastern Poland, in Jasionka, a village  from the center of the city of Rzeszów. It is the eighth-busiest airport in Poland.

History
Passenger domestic services to Rzeszów Airport began on 30 November 1945 with the opening of the circular domestic airline route number 1/2 Warszawa – Łódź –Kraków – Rzeszów – Lublin – Warszawa. The airport was re-built and opened for commercial traffic in 1949 after the first facilities built in 1940 were destroyed in 1944.

On 2 June 2007, LOT Polish Airlines commenced seasonal services to New York City's John F. Kennedy International Airport and Newark's Newark Liberty International Airport. Service to JFK has since ceased operations.

As of January 2008, the airport has had scheduled international flights to Dublin and London–Stansted, in addition to its domestic connection with Warsaw.

In 2009–10, it registered an 18.66% increase in passenger traffic serving 451,720 passengers in 2010. Coupled with the September 2006 start of construction on a new passenger terminal, this means that the airport is undergoing a rapid expansion, albeit in fits and starts, owing to delays in setting up the management company and obtaining financing and routes. The new passenger terminal opened in May 2012. Rzeszów Airport has been cited as an airport with below-forecast passenger numbers and an inefficient usage of EU subsidies. Rzeszow Jasionka Airport, however, underwent an ECA (European Court of Auditors) audit  in 2014 and - among 20 other European airports - its marks were positive in terms of efficiency and legitimacy using EU funds on airports' modernization.

During the 2022 Russia-Ukraine war, the airport has been used as a trans-shipment hub for Ukraine's civil, NGO and government supporters to resupply Ukraine and its people with medical aid, weapons and supplies. Weapons and medical supplies are flown to the airport and then driven across the Polish-Ukrainian border in trucks. On March 9, 2022, the United States deployed two Patriot surface-to-air missile systems to the airport in what it called a "precautionary defensive move."

Facilities

Airlines and destinations

The following airlines operate regular scheduled and charter flights to and from Rzeszów:

Statistics

See also
 List of airports in Poland

References

External links

 Official website 

Airports in Poland
Airport